Fea's tree rat or Indochinese chiromyscus (Chiromyscus chiropus) is a species of rodent in the family Muridae. It is found in Yunnan (China), eastern Myanmar, northern Thailand, Laos, and Vietnam.

References

Musser, G. G. and M. D. Carleton. 2005. Superfamily Muroidea. pp. 894–1531 in Mammal Species of the World a Taxonomic and Geographic Reference. D. E. Wilson and D. M. Reeder eds. Johns Hopkins University Press, Baltimore.

Old World rats and mice
Rodents of China
Rodents of Laos
Rodents of Myanmar
Rodents of Thailand
Rodents of Vietnam
Mammals described in 1891
Taxa named by Oldfield Thomas
Taxonomy articles created by Polbot